Michael Ashley Cecil Brinton,  (1942 – 23 April 2012) was the son of Esme Tatton Cecil Brinton (1919–1985) and Mary Elizabeth Fahnestock (1914–1960), and was the Lord Lieutenant of Worcestershire from 2001 to 2012. Previously, he was High Sheriff of Hereford and Worcester in 1990.

He was a former chairman of the British carpet company Brintons.

His spouse was Angela Brinton. Their children were Julian Brinton, Henry Brinton and Birdie Burnell and their grandchildren Charlie Brinton, Archie Brinton, Robert Brinton, Jake Burnell, Lily Burnell, Elodie Burnell and Margot Brinton.

References

|-

1942 births
2012 deaths
Commanders of the Royal Victorian Order
Lord-Lieutenants of Worcestershire
British chairpersons of corporations
20th-century English businesspeople